The Geely Boyue is a compact crossover SUV produced by the Chinese automaker Geely. The first generation model sold as the Atlas overseas was launched in 2016 and rebadged as the Proton X70 for Malaysia. The first generation Boyue received a more upmarket variant and was named the Boyue Pro in 2019 for the domestic market and Azkarra overseas. The Boyue Pro later spawned a pickup variant rebadged as the Farizon FX in 2020. An addition sports appearance update replaced the Boyue Pro in 2021 and was called the Boyue X. The Boyue received a facelift in 2022 and was sold alongside the Boyue X. The second generation Boyue called Boyue L was launched in October 2022 using the CMA platform.

First generation (NL-3; 2016)

Boyue/Atlas 

The Boyue was originally planned to be launched as part of the Emgrand series during development, the Boyue was launched as an independent product under the Geely brand on 26 March 2016. In the South American market, this SUV is offered under the name Geely Emgrand X7 Sport, being integrated into the Geely Emgrand product subdivision.

The Boyue was designed by a team led by Peter Horbury, the vehicle’s exterior design combines traditional Chinese cultural elements with modern languages of fashion. Since its launch, the Boyue has received much attention in the Chinese automobile market. The Boyue was facelifted in 2018. After 36 months, the total production number was 700,000.

Despite the introduction of the Boyue Pro in 2019 and the Boyue X in 2021 replacing the Pro, a special edition of the original Boyue remains to be available on the market as the Asian Games Edition as of 2021. As of April 2022, the original Boyue received a facelift for the 2022 model year featuring the same front fascia as the Boyue Pro with an updated vertical slotted grille insert and updated interior while the rear end remains to be the same as the previous version. The 2022 model year Boyue was sold alongside the Boyue X from the end of April 2022.

Proton X70 

On 24 May 2017, PROTON Holdings parent company DRB-HICOM announced plans to sell a 49.9% stake in Proton to Zhejiang Geely Automobile Holdings. Alongside the sale of stake, it was announced that Proton's first SUV would be based on the Geely Boyue. The Proton X70 launched in Malaysia in December 2018.

It was fully imported from China and featured only minor cosmetic changes inside and out. The most apparent change is that the Proton X70 is right-hand drive while the Geely Boyue is a left-hand drive vehicle.  Proton started the local assembly of the X70 in December 2019 with the launch in February 2020.

The Proton X70 was launched in Pakistan in December 2020.

Azkarra / Boyue Pro (2019)/X (2021) 

The facelifted version dubbed the Boyue Pro debuting in China in July 2019 and exported to overseas markets as the Geely Azkarra . The Boyue Pro updated design features restyled front and rear end designs. The Boyue Pro interior features the new GKUI19 infotainment system, all new cabin design and engine is the 1.8 litre turbocharged four-cylinder engine updated to meet new emission standards with a new option of 1.5-litre turbo three-cylinder engine that co-developed with Volvo which is same as one's in Geely Binyue.

Boyue X (2021 facelift) 
The Geely Boyue X was unveiled at the 2021 Chengdu Auto Show as an updated version of the Boyue Pro introduced over two years ago. The Boyue X is equipped with the same powertrain as the Boyue Pro while the front and rear end received redesigns as the first model introduced with Geely’s Vision Starburst design language. In October 2021, Geely launched the Boyue X in China with two engine options and a substantial amount of kit.

Farizon FX 

The Geely Farizon FX is a 4-door pickup truck based on the Boyue Pro sold from 2020. It features a monocoque design similar to the Hyundai Santa Cruz instead of a traditional ladder frame layout like most pickup trucks. It is powered by the same 1.8 litre turbo engine for the Boyue Pro. The truck is claimed to be the first car-based truck in China. The design retains the Boyue Pro's front fascia except the Expanding Cosmos grille. The rear is replaced by a truck bed with an integrated sport bar, wood flooring and a tonneau cover. The interior is largely different from its counterpart, as it has a larger centre console and a slightly different dashboard layout.

Second generation (Boyue L, FX11; 2022) 

The 2.0-litre turbo engines and 1.5-litre turbo engines are matched to a 7-speed DCT gearbox, the hybrid powertrains are mated to Geely’s DHT three-speed hybrid electric drive transmission.

The dashboard of the Boyue L features a 13.2-inch horizontal central touch screen, a 10.25-inch digital instrument cluster, and a four-spoke squared steering wheel. The operating system is Geely Galaxy OS Air and enables OTA updates with computing power comes from a Qualcomm 8155 chip.

Sales

References

Boyue
Cars introduced in 2016
2020s cars
Compact sport utility vehicles
Crossover sport utility vehicles
Front-wheel-drive vehicles
All-wheel-drive vehicles
Cars of China